Gällivare (or ;  or) is a locality and the seat of Gällivare Municipality in Norrbotten County, province of Lapland, Sweden with 8,449 inhabitants in 2010. The town was founded in the 17th century. Together with nearby towns Malmberget and Koskullskulle it forms a conurbation with some 15,000 inhabitants. This conurbation is the second northernmost significant urban area of Sweden after Kiruna.

Gällivare is situated at the northern end of the Inlandsbanan railway line, about 100 kilometres north of the Arctic Circle. Gällivare is located in a major iron ore mining region.
Adjacent to Gällivare (about five kilometres) is Malmberget, known as a site for iron ore extraction from deep mines by LKAB.

Outside Gällivare lies the ski resort Dundret, which is equipped with six ski lifts and ten groomed slopes along with a conference center and hotel. The ski season stretches from the end of October all the way into early May. The town has been host for several World Cup skiing events, both alpine and cross-country.

Gällivare is the center of the Firstborn Laestadian movement.
 
It was the host town for the 2008 VIVA World Cup and also the filming spot for Avicii's single "Addicted to You". Sweden's second-largest fast food chain, Max Hamburgers, was founded in Gällivare, though the headquarters have since relocated to Luleå.

Climate 
As expected given its high latitude, Gällivare has a rather cold climate. Under the Köppen climate classification it is a subarctic climate (Dfc). Winters are very severe by Scandinavian standards, but are somewhat moderated by marine air from the North Atlantic. As a result, certain cities on the North American Great Plains such as Winnipeg and Grand Forks, along with East Asian cities even further south, have colder January averages than Gällivare. The winter temperature varies greatly due to the city's location between the open ocean and a large, snow-covered land mass, and can be  one day to  the next.

Gällivare experiences midnight sun for a significant period of summer, though sees some glimpses of daylight even during the winter solstice due to its notable distance from the Arctic Circle. As a result of prolonged warming from early morning by the midnight sun and Gällivare's inland position, temperatures can occasionally get hot in the summer.

High incidence of congenital insensitivity to pain 
Some inhabitants near Gällivare, mainly in the village of Tjautjas (also Tjautjasjaure or Čavččas) 20 km outside Gällivare, have a remarkably high incidence of congenital insensitivity to pain, an extremely rare disease which inhibits the sensation of pain, heat and cold. There have been nearly 40 reported cases in the area.

Sports 
The following sports clubs are located in Gällivare:

 Gällivare Malmbergets FF

References 

Lapland (Sweden)
Municipal seats of Norrbotten County
Open-pit mines
Populated places in Arctic Sweden
Populated places in Gällivare Municipality
Swedish municipal seats

fi:Jällivaaran kunta